Envigado is the 18th station on line A of the Medellín Metro going south. It is named after the city where it is located, Envigado. The station was opened on 30 September 1996 as part of the extension of the line from Poblado to Itagüí.

References

External links
 Official site of Medellín Metro 

Medellín Metro stations
Railway stations opened in 1996
1996 establishments in Colombia